Coca-Cola Park is an 8,278-seat baseball park in Allentown, Pennsylvania.  It is the home field for the Lehigh Valley IronPigs, the Triple-A level Minor League Baseball affiliate of the Philadelphia Phillies.

Coca-Cola Park accommodates 10,178 fans, including auxiliary areas, Capital BlueCross Lawn, Dugout Suites, and Red Robin Tiki Terrace, and cost $50.25 million to build.  Naming rights to the stadium were awarded to Coca-Cola Bottling Co. of the Lehigh Valley on March 7, 2007.

Features
The stadium features the Majestic Clubhouse, which houses all team apparel. The Bud Light Trough is an area immediately behind the right field wall that provides patrons the opportunity to stand and socialize during the game. The "pig" theme is used in the majority of concession stands and stores. The Berks Picnic Patio is an area immediately adjacent to left field that features buffet style food and can be booked for group outings. The club level of the stadium features an indoor concourse with access to the club level seats, the suites and the two PenTeleData Party Porches. VIP Dugout Suites are situated immediately behind home plate and provide a unique viewing experience. Lehigh Valley Health Network Children's Hospital KidsZone features a free playground area. In addition, kids can take advantage of a number of games, including speed pitch, slides, and more. In 2012, the park added the Capital Blue Tiki Terrace in Left Field over the bullpens which features large group seating, tables for four, and a bar area accessible to all ticketed fans.

The stadium maximum capacity is 10,178 (8,278 seats plus seating for 1,900 on the grass berm in center field). There is one main scoreboard which is located at the 400' mark on the field. The scoreboard consists of a 20' × 50' high definition video board, a 76' × 4' LED ribbon board, as well as the park's iconic classic Coca-Cola bottle which also serves as a firework launcher when a run is scored. Coca-Cola Park has a wide variety of seating including a grass berm, picnic benches, fold-down seats, and standing room. The initial estimate of the IronPigs stadium was $48.4 million.  Its final price tag of $50.25 million, just 4 percent over the estimate, makes the minor league field one of the most expensive in the U.S.

Stadium highlights

Groundbreaking ceremonies for the new ballpark were held on September 6, 2006, and construction was completed in February 2008. Coca-Cola Park was built on land formerly owned by LSI Corporation. The field dimensions and wall heights are the same as those of Citizens Bank Park in South Philadelphia except left field is six feet closer (323 feet, with the addition of the new "Pig Pen" seating section in 2015, to the foul pole compared to 329), center field is one foot shorter and the right field foul pole is five feet closer (325 feet in Allentown compared to 330 feet at Citizens Bank Park).

With its completion, Coca-Cola Park is Allentown's newest stadium, but it is not the city's largest. That distinction belongs to J. Birney Crum Stadium, which has a seating capacity in excess of 15,000, and is the second largest outdoor high school stadium in Pennsylvania.

The layout of Coca-Cola Park is slightly different from most ballparks with the main entrance located on the right field line rather than the common location behind home plate.  Fans with club seating tickets, however, have a designated entrance behind home plate. A surprising moment of the park's opening season came on July 2, 2008 when musician John Mayer attended a Lehigh Valley IronPigs game and caught a foul ball. Mayer had kept a low profile until the television cameras spotted him with the ball. Mayer eventually autographed the ball, which now sits in the Majestic Clubhouse Store.

The park hosted its first major non-sporting event on July 14, 2009 with a concert headlined by Bob Dylan, Willie Nelson, and John Mellencamp. More than 10,000 people attended the five-hour show, which was sold out. Following the event's success, Coca-Cola Park management indicated there was a good possibility other concerts would be held at the park in the future.

The stadium hosted the 2010 Triple-A All-Star Game in which the International League All-Stars defeated the Pacific Coast League All-Stars, 2–1, and the stadium served as the Philadelphia Phillies' alternate training site in 2020 when the COVID-19 pandemic forced cancellation of the Minor League Baseball season and abbreviated the Major League Baseball season.

In August 2022, as Phillies' star right fielder Bryce Harper was designated to the IronPigs in a final step in his rehabilitation stint as part of his comeback from a fractured thumb, IronPigs' fans in Allentown greeted Harper's appearance enthusiastically, and games featuring Harper against the Gwinnett Stripers at Coca-Cola Park quickly sold out to the stadium's 10,100 capacity. In his August 23 appearance with the IronPigs at Coca-Cola Park, Harper homered twice against the Stripers.

Seats and pricing

Tickets for seats at Coca-Cola Park are much less expensive than those at major league ballparks.

 Capital Blue Cross Oasis "Island": $64/game (Price includes four tickets. Each "island" includes a circular half-table, cocktail-style seating for the four fans in the party and wait service.)
 Hot Corner: $21/game
 Club Level: $18/game ($16 Advanced Purchase)
 Field Level: $13/game ($11 Advanced Purchase
 Bacon Strip: $11/game
 Pig Pen (new in 2015): $21/game ($18 Advanced Purchase)
 General Admission Value*: $11/game (include a General Admission ticket as well as $5 of loaded value that can be redeemed for food, beverages or merchandise at Coca-Cola Park)
 General Admission*: $8/game
 General Admission ticketing allows fans access to the Capital BlueCross Lawn, the Bud Light Trough, the Capital Blue Cross Tiki Terrace Bar and all standing room drink rail areas on the concourse.

Location and transportation
The stadium is located on the east side of Allentown near two buildings owned by LSI Corporation. The eastern segment of American Parkway provides access to the main entrance to the stadium and is accessible from U.S. Route 22. Union Boulevard and Airport Road serve as local arterials to the stadium. Parking is available on several on-site lots; the cost is $5.

References

External links

Official website

2008 establishments in Pennsylvania
Baseball in Allentown, Pennsylvania
Baseball venues in Pennsylvania
Coca-Cola buildings and structures
International League ballparks
Music venues in Pennsylvania
Populous (company) buildings
Sports venues in Allentown, Pennsylvania
Sports venues completed in 2008
Tourist attractions in Allentown, Pennsylvania